Aldair Mengual Ortega (born 2 May 1997) is a Mexican professional footballer who plays as a defender.

References

External links
 

Living people
1997 births
Mexican footballers
Association football defenders
Cafetaleros de Chiapas footballers
Tuxtla F.C. footballers
Atlante F.C. footballers
Ascenso MX players
Liga Premier de México players
Tercera División de México players
Footballers from Quintana Roo